Ernest Henry Abbott (12 July 1883 – 18 October 1960) was an  Australian rules footballer who played with St Kilda in the Victorian Football League (VFL).

Abbott was originally from Traralgon in the West Gippsland Football Association.

Notes

External links 

1883 births
1960 deaths
Australian rules footballers from Victoria (Australia)
St Kilda Football Club players
Port Melbourne Football Club players